August Annist (until 1936 August Anni; 28 January 1899 Leie, Võisiku Parish – 6 April 1972 Tallinn) was an Estonian literary and folklore scholar, writer and translator.

Annist He participated on Estonian War of Independence. In 1920 he was one of the founders of student organization Veljesto. From 1918 until 1924, he studied at University of Tartu. From 1924 until 1927, he studied under scholarship in Helsinki, Bonn and the University of Paris. Annist graduated from the University of Tartu with a double master's degree in Estonian language and literature.

From 1929 until 1945, he taught at the Tartu University of Tartu (a docent since 1938). From 1932 until 1940, he edited the book series Elav teadus. From 1945 until 1951 he was in prison in Valga and Harku camp. 1958-1971 he worked at Estonian SSR Academy of Sciences' Institute of Language and Literature.

Works

 "Kalevala" kui kunstiteos. Tartu Eesti Kirjastus 1944
 Friedrich Reinhold Kreutzwaldi muinasjuttude algupära ja kunstiline laad. Eesti Raamat, Tallinn 1966
 Noorusmaa (collection of articles). Compiled by Hando Runnel. Ilmamaa, Tartu 2011

References

1899 births
1972 deaths
Estonian scholars
Estonian literary scholars
Estonian editors
Estonian male writers
20th-century Estonian writers
Estonian folklorists
Estonian translators
Estonian military personnel of the Estonian War of Independence
University of Tartu alumni
Academic staff of the University of Tartu
Prisoners and detainees of the Soviet Union
People from Viljandi Parish